Abby Gustaitis (born May 9, 1991) is an American rugby union player. She debuted for the  against France 2016. She was selected for the squad to the 2017 Women's Rugby World Cup in Ireland.

Gustaitis was introduced to the sport of rugby by a friend while attending the University of Maryland. After the 2017 World Cup she was recruited to the University of Canberra's sevens team.

Personal life
Gustaitis is the daughter of Stan and Tammy Gustaitis. She has two older brothers. She attended North Harford High School, where she played basketball and graduated in 2009. She attended the University of Maryland, College Park and graduated with a degree in Physiology and Neurobiology in 2013. .

References

External links 
 Abby Gustaitis at USA Rugby
 
 Abby Gustaitis at the 2019 Pan American Games
 
 
 
 
 

1991 births
Living people
American female rugby union players
American people of Lithuanian descent
United States women's international rugby union players
University System of Maryland alumni
American female rugby sevens players
Pan American Games medalists in rugby sevens
Pan American Games silver medalists for the United States
Rugby sevens players at the 2019 Pan American Games
Medalists at the 2019 Pan American Games
Rugby sevens players at the 2020 Summer Olympics
Olympic rugby sevens players of the United States
21st-century American women